Sphagnum pulchrum is a species of moss belonging to the family Sphagnaceae.

It has almost cosmopolitan distribution.

References

pulchrum